Franz Wilhelm Sieber (30 March 1789 – 17 December 1844), was a botanist and collector who travelled to Europe, the Middle East, Southern Africa and Australia.

Early life

Franz Sieber was born in Prague, Bohemia on 30 March 1789.
After 5 years of study at the Gymnasium, endowed with a considerable talent for the graphic arts, he studied architecture, switched to engineering and finally settled on natural history, in particular botany.

Expeditions

He made several collecting trips to Italy, Crete, Greece, Egypt and Palestine followed by a two-year-long expedition to Australia, Mauritius and South Africa, collecting not only plants, but also animals, art and ethnographic objects. He spent seven months in Sydney (then more usually called Port Jackson) from 1 June 1823 until December 1823 where he collected 645 local plant specimens.

He never reached the Western hemisphere (in contradistinction to Friedrich Wilhelm Sieber, an employee of Johann Centurius Hoffmannsegg), but sent several people to make collections for him, notably Franz Kohaut in the Antilles and Wenceslas Bojer on Mauritius.

Later life and death

His behavior and publications became progressively more erratic. He was constantly involved in quarrels with the authorities and rapidly became more and more deranged.  Having “discovered” a cure for rabies he appeared in front of the city elders of Prague and demanded financial support. Soon thereafter he landed in the Prague insane asylum, where he spent the fourteen final years of his life, dying there at the age of fifty-five.

Legacy

He is commemorated in the genus Siebera J.Gay (Asteraceae), and many species, e.g. Acacia sieberiana, DC, Pleurothallis sieberi Luer, or Allium sieberianum Schult.f., 
Crocus sieberi,  Phyteuma sieberi, Luzula sieberi, Eucalyptus sieberi, Cheilanthes sieberi, Callistemon sieberi, Badula sieberi, and Hosta sieberiana, though some of these names may also have honored Friedrich Wilhelm Sieber.

References

External sources

Publications
Books by and about Sieber on WorldCat

1789 births
1844 deaths
Botanists active in Australia
Botanical collectors active in Australia
19th-century Austrian botanists
German Bohemian people
Scientists from Prague